Ağlamak Güzeldir (translated from Turkish: "Crying is Good") is Sezen Aksu's fourth Turkish release and her most commercially successful album in Turkey.

Track listing
 "Düşünce" ("Idea"; 3:57) (lyrics: Sezen Aksu, music-edit: Atilla Özdemiroğlu)
 "Ağlamak Güzeldir" ("Crying is Good"; 2:46) (lyrics-music: Sezen Aksu, edit: Atilla Özdemiroğlu)
 "Yak Bir Sigara" ("Burn a Cigarette"; 4:02) (lyrics-music: Özdemir Erdoğan, edit: Atilla Özdemiroğlu)
 "Köprü" ("Bridge"; 3:12) (lyrics: Sezen Aksu, music: Atilla Özdemiroğlu, edit: Atilla Özdemiroğlu)
 "Yalnız Kullar (Tanrım)" (("Lonely Servants (God)"; 3:40) (lyrics: Sevgi Şanlı, music-edit: Atilla Özdemiroğlu)
 "En Uzun Gece" ("The Longest Night"; 4:03) (lyrics: Aysel Gürel, music: Atilla Özdemiroğlu, edit: Atilla Özdemiroğlu)
 "Biliyorsun" ("You Know"; 5:16) (lyrics-music: Sezen Aksu, edit: Atilla Özdemiroğlu)
 "Ben Her Bahar Aşık Olurum" ("EVery Spring I Fall in Love"; 3:47) (lyrics: Aysel Gürel, music: Selmi Andak, edit: Atilla Özdemiroğlu)
 "Lunapark" (3:51) (lyrics: Aysel Gürel, music: Atilla Özdemiroğlu, edit: Onno Tunç)
 "Hoşgörü" ("Tolerance"; 3:16) (lyrics: Aysel Gürel, music-edit: Onno Tunç)

External links
 

1981 albums
Sezen Aksu albums
Turkish-language albums